The 2004 Africa Cup (officially called "Africa Top ten" at the time) was the fifth edition of top level rugby union tournament in Africa. Ten teams were admitted, but Tunisia withdrew.

The final was played in 2004, due to the participation of Namibia to the 2003 Rugby World Cup tournament.

The teams were divided into two zones, North and South. The North Zone contained four teams in a round robin pool. In South Zone, the six teams were divided in two pools, with a "Zone final" between the winner of each pool.

At the end a second division was also played as "CAR Development".

Division 1 (Africa Cup)

North Zone

South Zone

Pool 1

Pool 2

South Zone Final

Final

Division 2

References 
  Africa Cup 2004 Espn-Scum.com

2004
2004 rugby union tournaments for national teams
2004 in African rugby union